The men's 400 metres event at the 2005 Summer Universiade was held on 15–17 August in Izmir, Turkey.

Medalists

Results

Heats

Semifinals

Final

References

Finals results
Full results

Athletics at the 2005 Summer Universiade
2005